The Taz is a river located in western Siberia, has a length of  and drains a basin estimated at . Its middle and lower course are located within Yamalo-Nenets Autonomous Okrug, while its upper course borders with Krasnoyarsk Krai.

The now ruined city of Mangazeya was located by the Taz.

Course
The Taz begins near Lake Dynda, Siberian Uvaly, a hilly area of the West Siberian Plain. It flows roughly northwestwards across largely uninhabited areas. A portage connects the Taz with the Turukhan and the Yenisey. There are numerous lakes in its basin, such as the Chyortovo.

Its major tributaries include the Bolshaya Shirta and Khudosey from the right and the Tolka and Chaselka from the left.

See also
List of rivers of Russia
Upper Taz Nature Reserve

References

External links

 Flooding
Pictures taken by Landsat showing areas in western Siberia allegedly changing owing to global warming
Ethnographic data of the Taz River area
Bears in the Taz River area

 
Rivers of Krasnoyarsk Krai
Rivers of Yamalo-Nenets Autonomous Okrug